Twin Lakes is an unincorporated community and census-designated place (CDP) in Logan County, Oklahoma, United States. It was first listed as a CDP prior to the 2020 census.

The CDP is on the western edge of Logan County, bordered to the west by Kingfisher County. The Cimarron River forms the southern edge of the community.

Demographics

References 

Census-designated places in Logan County, Oklahoma
Census-designated places in Oklahoma